"Kodachrome" is a song by the American singer-songwriter Paul Simon. It was the lead single from his third studio album, There Goes Rhymin' Simon (1973), released on Columbia Records.  The song is named after Kodak's now-discontinued reversal film brand Kodachrome.

Description
After a review in Billboards May 12 issue praising its "cheerfully antisocial lyrics," the song debuted at No. 82 in the Hot 100 on the week-ending May 19, 1973. The lyrics to this song on There Goes Rhymin' Simon differed in wording from those on The Concert in Central Park (1982) and Paul Simon's Concert in the Park, August 15, 1991 albums.  The lyrics on the original album version said, "everything looks worse in black and white," but on the live albums he sang, "everything looks better''' in black and white." Simon said, "I can't remember which way I originally wrote it – 'better' or 'worse' – but I always change it.... 'Kodachrome' was a song that was originally called 'Goin' Home.'"

Development

In an interview conducted in November 2008, Simon said that what he had in mind when writing the song was to call it "Going Home". However, finding this would have been "too conventional", he came up with "Kodachrome", because of its similar sound and larger innovative potential. He also refers to its first line as the "most interesting" part of the song.

Chart performance
Four weeks after its debut on the Hot 100, the song moved to No. 9, sandwiched ahead of "Tie a Yellow Ribbon Round the Ole Oak Tree" by Dawn featuring Tony Orlando and behind May 19, 1973, Hot 100 top debut (No. 59) "Give Me Love (Give Me Peace on Earth)" by George Harrison.

Two weeks later "Kodachrome" peaked at No. 2 on the Billboard Hot 100, behind "Will It Go Round in Circles" by Billy Preston. It peaked at No. 2 the Billboard'' adult contemporary chart, as well.  In the United Kingdom, the song was marketed as the B-side to "Take Me to the Mardi Gras" (CBS 1578). The song was banned by the BBC and also by the Federation of (Australian) Radio Broadcasters.

Weekly charts

Year-end charts

Personnel
The musicians on this session were the Muscle Shoals Rhythm Section.

 Paul Simon – vocals, acoustic guitar
 Pete Carr – acoustic guitar
 Jimmy Johnson – electric guitars
 David Hood – bass guitar
 Roger Hawkins – double-tracked drums
 Barry Beckett – Wurlitzer electronic piano, Hammond organ, tack piano
 Uncredited – horns

Notes

References

Sources

External links
 

1973 songs
1973 singles
Paul Simon songs
Songs written by Paul Simon
Song recordings produced by Phil Ramone
Song recordings produced by Paul Simon
Columbia Records singles
Kodak
Censorship of music